The Battle of Parramatta was a battle of the Australian Frontier Wars which occurred in Sydney on March 1797. In the conflict, Aboriginal resistance leader Pemulwuy led a group of Bidjigal warriors, estimated to be at least 100, in an attack on a government farm at Toongabbie, challenging the garrison of redcoats to battle.

Conflict 
The settlers and soldiers took up their muskets and chased the Aboriginal warriors through the night. At dawn, they encountered about 100 Aborigines just outside Parramatta, who ran away. The settlers entered Parramatta and, one hour later, according to David Collins, "were followed by a large body of natives, headed by Pe-mul-wy, a riotous and troublesome savage". 

When confronted, Pemulwuy threw a spear at a soldier prompting the government troops and settlers to open fire. Pemulwuy was shot seven times and was wounded. The aboriginal warriors threw many spears, hitting one man in the arm. The difference in firepower was evident and five aboriginal warriors were killed instantly.

Outcome
The Bidjigal suffered great losses and were forced to retreat. The soldiers took Pemulwuy to the hospital in Parramatta. He went in and out of consciousness for days and his death was thought to be imminent. Against expectations, Pemulwuy recovered and he escaped a few weeks later with his legcuffs still in place.<ref></ref}

See also 
 Battle of Richmond Hill

References 

History of Sydney
Military history of New South Wales
1797 in Australia
Conflicts in 1797
Hawkesbury and Nepean Wars